The mixed pairs BC4 boccia event at the 2020 Summer Paralympics was contested between 2 and 4 September 2021 at the Ariake Gymnastics Centre. Since this event is a mixed event, both genders, male and female, competed in the event.

The competition started off with a pools stage, containing 2 pools with 5 teams each, and was followed by the semifinals where the winners moved to the finals to fight for gold and the losers went to the bronze medal match to fight for bronze.

Rosters
Each team contains three athletes but only two will be used when play. All team has a male (M) and female (F) athlete.

Brazil:
Eliseu dos Santos (M)
M. dos Santos (M)
Ercileide da Silva (F)
Canada:
Alison Levine (F)
Iulian Ciobanu (M)
Marco Dispaltro (M)
Colombia:
Euclides Grisales (M)
Duban Cely (M)
Leidy Chica Chica (F)
Great Britain:
Stephen McGuire (M)
Louis Saunders (M)
Evie Edwards (F)
Hong Kong:
Leung Yuk Wing (M)
Lau Wai Yan Vivian (F)
Wong Kwan Hang (M)

Japan:
Shun Esaki (M)
Wataru Furumitsu (M)
Juri Kimura (F)
Portugal:
Pedro Carla (M)
Manuel Cruz (M)
Carla Oliveira (F)
RPC:
Sergey Safin (M)
Ivan Frolov (M)
Daria Adonina (F)
Slovakia:
Samuel Andrejčík (M)
Michaela Balcová (F)
Martin Streharsky (M)
Thailand:
Pornchok Larpyen (M)
Ritthikrai Somsanuk (M)
Nuanchan Phonsila (F)

Pools
The pools (or can be known as a group stage) were played between 2 and 3 September 2021. The top two teams in each pool qualified for the semi-finals.

Pool A

Pool B

Knockout stage
The knockout stage was played on 4 September.

References

Paris BC4